The Apostolic Nunciature to Trinidad and Tobago is an ecclesiastical office of the Catholic Church in Trinidad and Tobago. It is a diplomatic post of the Holy See, whose representative is called the Apostolic Nuncio with the rank of an ambassador. The nuncio resides in Port of Spain, Trinidad.

List of papal representatives to Trinidad and Tobago 
Apostolic Pro-Nuncios
Paul Fouad Naïm Tabet (9 February 1980 - 8 September 1984)
Manuel Monteiro de Castro (16 February 1985 - 21 August 1990)
Apostolic Nuncios 
Eugenio Sbarbaro (7 February 1991 - 26 April 2000)
Emil Paul Tscherrig (8 July 2000 - 22 May 2004)
Thomas Edward Gullickson (2 October 2004 - 21 May 2011)
Nicola Girasoli (21 December 2011 - 16 June 2017)
Fortunatus Nwachukwu (4 November 2017 – 17 December 2021)
Santiago de Wit Guzmán (30 July 2022    – present)

See also
Apostolic Delegation to the Antilles

References

Trinidad and Tobago